Eucalyptus campaspe, commonly known as silver gimlet or the silver-topped gimlet, is a species of tree that is endemic to Western Australia. It has smooth, shiny bark, lance-shaped adult leaves, flower buds in groups of seven, white flowers and cup-shaped or conical fruit.

Description
The stems are twisted and a lignotuber is not formed. They are also dull, glaucous to grey-green and weather to glossy with age. Flowering occurs between January and March and the flowers are white.

Taxonomy and naming
Eucalyptus campaspe was first formally described by the botanist Spencer Le Marchant Moore in 1899 in a paper entitled The Botanical Results of a Journey into the Interior of Western Australia, published in the Botanical Journal of the Linnean Society. The type specimen had been collected by Moore in 1895 from near Gibraltar in the Goldfields area of Western Australia. The specific epithet (campaspe) refers to Campaspe, the mistress of Alexander the Great, but the allusion is not known.

Eucalyptus campaspe  is one of the six true gimlet species that have buds in groups of seven. The other true gimlets are E. ravida , E. effusa , E. salubris, E. terebra and E. tortilis. The non-glaucous E. salubris is easily distinguished from E. ravida and E. campaspe both of which have conspicuously glaucous branchlets.

Distribution
Silver gimlet is found on stony hillsides and flats in the Goldfields-Esperance region between Kalgoorlie and Norseman where it grows in sandy-loam-clay soils. It is often part of low woodland communities on calcareous plains or alluvial flats. Associated species in this environment include trees such as: E. salubris, E. gracilis often with E. salmonophloia and Casuarina cristata. Also included in these woodlands are shrubs like Santalum acuminatum, Atriplex vesicaria, Atriplex nummularia and species of Eremophila and Dodonaea. Ground species in these communities include Plantago debilis, Helipterum strictum, Gnephosis brevifolia, Ptilotus exaltatus and Senecio glossanthus.

See also

List of Eucalyptus species

References

Eucalypts of Western Australia
Trees of Australia
campaspe
Myrtales of Australia
Plants described in 1898